Shell icon overlays are icons that Microsoft Windows can display on top of folder icons. A list of icon overlays is specified in the Windows Registry in the location mentioned further in this article. In the current implementation there are 4 bits in a structure that define the overlay index providing for a maximum of 15 overlays, 4 of which are reserved by the operating system. Therefore, even though more than 11 icon overlay handlers can be registered, only the first 11 icon overlays supplied by icon overlay handlers are effectively displayed. The remaining icon overlay handlers are not used.

Many applications such as versioning software like TortoiseSVN and cloud storage synchronization software like Nextcloud, Dropbox, and OneDrive add their own icon overlay handlers to the Registry upon installation. Below is a table of shell icon overlay identifiers by software.

Location 
All shell icon overlay identifiers are located in the Windows Registry.Computer\HKEY_LOCAL_MACHINE\SOFTWARE\Microsoft\Windows\CurrentVersion\Explorer\ShellIconOverlayIdentifiers

List

References

Registry
Configuration files